Samuel Robert Webster (July 7, 1854 in Elba, Wisconsin – March 12, 1948) was a member of the Wisconsin State Assembly.

Webster was born on the Webster farm in Elba, Wisconsin, east of Columbus. He attended high school in Danville, Wisconsin and Columbus before attending Ripon College and the Milwaukee Business College. Webster's son, Harold, became County Surveyor of Milwaukee County, Wisconsin. The elder Webster and his family were Congregationalists. Webster married Harriet Chamberlin (1854–1939) in 1879. Webster died in Columbus.

Career
Webster was elected to the Assembly in 1896, 1916 and 1918. He was a Republican.

References

External links

1854 births
1948 deaths
Republican Party members of the Wisconsin State Assembly
American Congregationalists
20th-century Congregationalists
People from Columbus, Wisconsin
Ripon College (Wisconsin) alumni
People from Elba, Wisconsin